Fried green tomatoes may refer to:

 Fried green tomatoes, a traditional culinary dish in the Southern United States
 Fried Green Tomatoes at the Whistle Stop Cafe, the 1987 novel by Fannie Flagg
 Fried Green Tomatoes, the 1991 film adaptation of the Flagg novel
 Fried Green Tomatoes (score), the original film score by Thomas Newman
 Fried Green Tomatoes, the 2000 music album by country music artist Ricky Van Shelton